Efrem "The Bean" Schulz (born December 16, 1974) is an American punk rock singer of Mexican descent, best known for his work with Death by Stereo. As of Paul Miner's departure in 2005, he is the only remaining original member of the band. He also took over as lead singer of Voodoo Glow Skulls following the departure of "Frank Voodoo" Casillas, and is the frontman for the Chicano-themed punk parody band Manic Hispanic.

He was previously in a band called Clint (named so because of a friend named Clint), who released two demos, a 7 Inch, and a full-length disc. Prior bands to Clint include Blue Bottle and Hard As Mother Nature. The full-length was released by the owner of Bionic Records, Dennis Smith, and Paul Miner, who later went on to become the bass player for Death by Stereo.

In 2005, Efrem appeared in the song "Botnus" on the album Enter the Chicken by Buckethead & Friends, an album produced by and featuring System of a Down's Serj Tankian. Efrem also performed guest vocals on the Atreyu album Suicide Notes and Butterfly Kisses and on the Aiden album Conviction.

Efrem has had a number of other jobs at Punk rock labels and so on, including  working at Revelation Records and Kung Fu Records and Films for a while as a production assistant and as a club DJ.

Currently, Efrem is the road manager and merchandise manager for Rusko.

References

External links 
 Efrem Schulz at MySpace

1974 births
Living people
Death by Stereo members
American musicians of Mexican descent
American punk rock singers
American male songwriters
21st-century American singers
21st-century American male singers
Hispanic and Latino American musicians